Annika Schleu (born 3 April 1990) is a German modern pentathlete. She won the gold medal of the relay event at the 2012 World Championships and 2017 World Championships. She has competed in three Olympic Games, finishing in 26th place in 2012 and in 4th place in 2016.

She was born in Berlin, Germany.

Individual events 
She won the silver medal at the 2018 World Championships.  At junior level, she also won silver at the 2008 European Junior Championships.

Schleu was leading the competition at the 2020 Tokyo Olympics when she was unable to successfully complete the show jumping event, moving her from first to last place, and an eventual 31st place. Her trainer, Kim Raisner was sent home from the Olympics after footage showed her seemingly punch Schleu's assigned horse for not performing in a desired manner. The horse named Saint Boy was randomly assigned from a pool of 18 and had also refused to jump for Russian Olympic Committee athlete Gulnaz Gubaydullina, refusing three barriers. Schleu has also faced a backlash against her repeated use of the whip and rough handling of her horse. The incident prompted German Olympic team member and equestrian medal record holder Isabell Werth to criticize Pentathlon's use of horses; she stated that "Pentathlon has nothing to do with equestrian sport" and treats sensitive creatures as "a means of transport to which the athletes have no connection." Werth also expressed sympathy for Schleu, whom she saw as a victim of the system of the sport.

Team events 
With Lena Schöneborn, Schleu won the women's relay gold medal at the 2016 and 2017 World Championships.  Schleu had previously been in the 2012 women's relay gold medal winning team with Schöneborn and Janine Kohlmann.  She had already won silver in 2011 with Schöneborn and Eva Trautmann, at both the European Championships and the World Championships.

She was also part of the German women's relay team that won the silver medal at the 2014 and 2017 European Championship, alongside Lena Schöneborn.  She again won silver at the 2018 World Championships, this time with Ronja Steinborn.  At the 2013 European Championships, she won the bronze medal teaming with Schöneborn and Claudia Knack.

At Junior level, she was part of the German team which won the mixed relay gold at the 2011 Junior World Championships.

Controversies 

Schleu competed at the 2020 Summer Olympics in the modern pentathlon with her horse, Saint Boy. During the competition, Schleu was becoming visually upset at the performance of the horse, as it did not gallop or jump in the ways nesseccary for her to be successful in the competition. Her coach, Kim Raisner, began to encourage Schleu to whip and beat the horse, in an attempt to scare the horse into a better performance. During this, Raisner leant forward over the railing and landed a punch onto the horse. After the competition ended, with Schleu coming 31st, the UIPM disqualified Raisner from the games.

References

External links
 
 
 
 

1990 births
Living people
Sportspeople from Berlin
German female modern pentathletes
Modern pentathletes at the 2012 Summer Olympics
Modern pentathletes at the 2016 Summer Olympics
Modern pentathletes at the 2020 Summer Olympics
Olympic modern pentathletes of Germany
World Modern Pentathlon Championships medalists
Animal cruelty incidents
20th-century German women
21st-century German women